is a 2011 video game compilation published for iOS devices by Namco Bandai Games. It was created to commemorate the 30th anniversary of Galaga.

It allows users to play remakes of the games in the Galaxian series. It is free to download and comes with Galagas predecessor, Galaxian. The remakes of Galaga, Gaplus, and Galaga '88 are available as in-app purchases either separately or as a bundle. The graphics from the original games are shaded to look "glossy", and music is added to parts that didn't have music in the original games. The application also has a one and a half minute long CGI video that plays as an intro before the title screen, and it features "Galaga points", collected as the games are played and used to unlock various consumable power-ups and special arcade cabinet designs, including the original art for each game.

The application has been pulled from the App Store on March 31, 2017.

Reception

Galaga 30th Collection was listed as an honorable mention for Gamasutra's Top 10 Games Of The Year for 2011.

Notes

References

2011 video games
Bandai Namco games
Bandai Namco video game compilations
Galaxian
IOS-only games
IOS games
Video games developed in Japan